The SuperDisk LS-120 is a high-speed, high-capacity alternative to the 90 mm (3.5 in), 1.44 MB floppy disk. The SuperDisk hardware was created by 3M's storage products group Imation in 1997, with manufacturing chiefly by Matsushita.

The SuperDisk had little success in North America; with Compaq, Gateway and Dell being three of only a few OEMs who supported it. It was more successful in Asia and Australia, where the second-generation SuperDisk LS-240 drive and disk was released. SuperDisk worldwide ceased manufacturing in 2003.

History
The design of the SuperDisk system came from an early 1990s project at Iomega. It is one of the last examples of floptical technology, where lasers are used to guide a magnetic head which is much smaller than those used in traditional floppy disk drives. Iomega orphaned the project around the time they decided to release the Zip drive in 1994. The idea eventually ended up at 3M, where the concept was refined and the design was licensed to established floppy drive makers Matsushita and Mitsubishi. Other companies involved in the development of SuperDisk include Compaq and OR Technology.

Matsushita continued development of the technology and released the LS-240. It has double the capacity of the LS-120 and the added feature of being able to format regular floppy disks to 32 MB capacity. However, this higher density comes at a price – the entire disk must be rewritten any time a change is made, much like early CD-RW media.

A SuperDisk drive was used in two Panasonic digital cameras, the PV-SD4090 and PV-SD5000, which allowed them to use both SuperDisk (LS120) and 3.5" floppy disks as the memory media.

Technical information
The SuperDisk's format was designed to supersede the floppy disk with its higher-capacity media that imitated the ubiquitous format with its own 120 MB (and later 240 MB) disk storage while the SuperDisk drive itself was backwards compatible with 1.44 MB and 720 KB floppy formats (MFM). Superdisk drives read and write faster to these sorts of disks than conventional 1.44 MB or 720 KB floppy drives. The newer LS-240 drives also have the ability to read and write regular 1.44 MB floppies at much higher densities.

The true capacity of these "SD120MB" drives is 120.375 MiB aka 126.22 MB (FAT16B with logical geometry 963/8/32 CHS × 512 bytes). The "SD240MB" drives have a capacity of 229.25 MiB aka 240.39 MB (FAT16B with logical geometry 262/32/56 CHS × 512 bytes). 1.44 MB HD floppies formatted to 32 MB as "FD32MB" (FAT16B with logical geometry 1024/2/32 CHS × 512 bytes) in the LS-240 show a dummy FAT12 file system (with logical geometries 160/2/9 or 80/2/18) when inserted into a normal floppy drive.

SuperDisk drives have been sold in parallel port, USB, ATAPI and SCSI variants. All drives can read and write 1.44 MB and 720 KiB MFM floppies, as used on PCs, Apple Macintoshes (High Density format only, see below), and many workstations. 2.88 MB floppy formats are not supported.

Imation also released a version of the SuperDisk with "Secured Encryption Technology", which uses Blowfish with a 64-bit key to encrypt the contents.

Criticism and obsolescence
Macintosh users found trouble making SuperDisk drives work with the GCR 800 KB or 400 KB diskettes used by older Macintoshes. These disks could be used in a SuperDisk drive only if formatted to PC 720 KB MFM format. Note that almost no other USB floppy drives supported Mac GCR floppies.

The biggest hurdle standing in the way of success was that Iomega's Zip drive had been out for three years when SuperDisk had been released. Zip had enough popularity to leave the public mostly uninterested in SuperDisk, despite its superior design and its compatibility with the standard floppy disk.

By 2000, the entire removable magnetic disk category was finally obsoleted by the falling prices of CD-R and CD-RW drives, and later on solid-state (USB flash drives or USB keydrives). Over the next few years, SuperDisk was quietly discontinued, even in areas where it was popular. Today, disks are very hard to find.

Under Windows XP, a USB SuperDisk drive will appear as a 3.5" floppy disk drive, receiving either the drive letter A: (if there is no floppy in the machine) or B: (if there already is one). This enables use by software that expects a floppy drive when 1.44 MB or 720 KB disks are inserted. 120 MB and 240 MB disks are also accessed via A: or B:.

Practicality
The USB models were quite popular for debugging and installing servers that did not have a CD drive available. They could both store massive numbers of drivers for installation purposes as well as be used to run live operating systems, such as ReactOS, which amounts to 150 MB.

See also
 Caleb UHD144
 Floptical
 Sony HiFD
 IBM Extended Density Format, technically unrelated special format for traditional HD floppy controllers, also providing a mini file system containing a README file similar to the LS-240's FD32M format.
 Zip drive

References

Floppy disk drives